The Nano House was named to be the world's smallest sustainable house. 

The Nano Living System is a Swiss made "green" pre-engineered concept for residential use that presents an innovative and sustainable architectural proposition. The design was based on a combination of pre-engineered SIPs (made from cement fiberboard, recycled light gauge steel and polyurethane foam), creation of flexible spaces (through Nano Living Systems' "suspending technology") and use of renewable energy systems. This suggests an optimistic and environmental solution for the global housing issue of very small living spaces at extremely high prices.

This is made possible by the incorporation of the "suspending technology", which nearly doubles the size of the living area within this space by transforming what is common living space by day into two separate bedrooms by night. The "suspending technology" can be used in new construction and can also be adapted to be used in existing structures, such as hotels, studios, dormitories and very small housing.

References
http://inhabitat.com/2010/04/15/worlds-smallest-sustainable-house-can-accommodate-a-family-of-four/
http://www.greenlivingonline.com/article/worlds-smallest-sustainable-house
http://greentech.iblog.co.za/2010/04/15/worlds-smallest-sustainable-house/
http://www.architecture-view.com/2010/05/08/sustainable-worlds-smallest-houses-able-to-accommodate-four-families/the-smallest-of-the-sustainable-house/
https://web.archive.org/web/20121209052648/http://www.ecofriend.org/entry/nano-living-systems-the-world-s-smallest-sustainable-house/
http://www.greenerideal.com/building/8768-building/7000-the-worlds-smallest-sustainable-house
http://nanolivingsystem.com/

House types
Sustainable buildings and structures